or Magic Monkey is a soundtrack released by Godiego for the television show of the same name, known as Monkey in the west. After its initial release in 1978 as an LP and Compact Cassette, it was recognized by the Oricon as the number 1 selling record and cassette for 1979. It was later released on a CD on October 21, 1993, and then again as a remastered CD on March 19, 2008.

Summary
It was initially released as Magic Monkey (Saiyūki) in Japan, as Monkey in the UK, and Magic Monkey in Australia ("Magic Monkey" appears on the original Japanese release). The track listing of the UK-edition differs slightly from the original Japanese release, while the Australian edition is identical to the Japanese release. All of the songs are sung entirely in English on the Japanese release, whereas the British and Australian releases contain a half-Japanese and half-English version of "Gandhara".

Track list

References

Godiego albums
Television soundtracks
1978 soundtrack albums
Nippon Columbia soundtracks